The 1984–85 European Cup was the 20th edition of the European Cup, IIHF's premier European club ice hockey tournament. The season started on October 4, 1984, and finished on September 7, 1985.

The tournament was won by CSKA Moscow, who won the final group.

First round

 Tappara,   
 VEU Feldkirch,   
 HC Bolzano,   
 Sparta Sarpsborg,  
 TMH Polonia Bytom    :  bye

Second round

 AIK,   
 Kölner EC,
 Dynamo Berlin,   
 Dukla Jihlava,  
 CSKA Moscow    :  bye

Third round

Final Group
(Megève, France)

Final group standings

References
 Season 1985

1984–85 in European ice hockey
IIHF European Cup